Rian de Souza Marques (born 1982 in Rio de Janeiro, Brazil), commonly known as Rian Marques, is a Brazilian footballer who currently plays for Thailand Yamaha League 1 club Thai Honda as a midfielder.

Football career

Begin
He began his career in Botafogo F.R. youth team in 1997. He was transferred to Europe in 1998 to PSV Eindhoven youth team and began his career as professional one year after in Belgium for K.F.C. Turnhout (today's K.V. Turnhout).

Guatemala and Finland
After this season he played to Guatemala in Juventud Retalteca and the next season he returned to Europe to play in Finland in the squad of Pallo-Iirot.

Qatar
After his great season in Finland he was transferred to Qatar. His first club in Qatar was Al-Mesaimeer. After the great season he was transferred to Al-Shamal who was interested in him and he signed a two-years contract.

Thailand
After three years in Qatar, he had an offer to play in Thailand at Bangkok United, where he played for five months, being sold to Nakhon Ratchasima the same country.

Hong Kong
On 20 July 2013, he joined Hong Kong First Division League club Hong Kong Rangers for an undisclosed fee. On 18 September 2013, he was announced on Facebook Page of Yuen Long District SA, also Hong Kong First Division League club.

Thailand
After almost one year in Hong Kong, he moves back to the Thailand. This time is to play in Thai Honda, a club in Yamaha League 1 and sponsored by Honda Motor.

Honours
PSV Eindhoven
Philips Cup
 Winner: 1999

Turnhout
Antwerpen Tournament
 Winner: 2002

Al-Mesaimeer
Qatargas League
 3rd Place: 2009–10

Al-Shamal
Qatargas League
 Runner-Up: 2010–11

Thai Honda F.C.
Regional League Bangkok Area Division
 Champion: 2014

References

1982 births
Footballers from Rio de Janeiro (city)
Brazilian footballers
Expatriate footballers in Thailand
Living people
Association football midfielders
Hong Kong Rangers FC players
Yuen Long FC players